"Shake Your Bon-Bon" is the third single taken from the second self-titled album by Ricky Martin. It was released on October 12, 1999. It was later sent to radio stations in the United States on November 1, 1999.

The U.S. maxi-single includes "Almost a Love Song", which is an English version of Martin's song "Casi un Bolero", taken from the Grammy-winning album Vuelve. The Australian maxi-single also contains one new song, called "Ay, Ay, Ay It's Christmas".

Music video
The music video aired in September 1999, and was directed once again by Wayne Isham. Ricky Martin received nominations for Best Male Video and Best Dance Video at the 2000 MTV Video Music Awards.

Chart performance
"Shake Your Bon-Bon" peaked at number twenty-two on the Billboard Hot 100 in the United States.

It also peaked at number twelve in the United Kingdom and number twenty-seven in Australia, where it was certified Gold.

Live performances
Martin delivered a performance of "Shake Your Bon-Bon" on the BBC's Top of the Pops on November 19, 1999.

In popular culture
 The song was also used in two TV spots for the ninth-generation Toyota Corolla, with actor Brad Pitt driving the car (2001).
 William Hung recorded this song on his album Inspiration (2004).
 The lyrics "Shake your bon-bon, shake your" are sung by a penguin in the animated film Happy Feet (2006).

Formats and track listings

Australian CD maxi-single
"Shake Your Bon-Bon" – 3:12
"Shake Your Bon-Bon" (Eddie's Club Radio Edit) – 3:53
"Shake Your Bon-Bon" (Eddie's Rhythm Radio Mix) – 4:53
"Ay, Ay, Ay It's Christmas" – 3:03

European CD single
"Shake Your Bon-Bon" (Album Version) – 3:12
"Shake Your Bon-Bon" (Eddie's Rhythm Radio Mix) – 4:53

European 12" single
"Shake Your Bon-Bon" (Album Version) – 3:12
"Shake Your Bon-Bon" (Eddie's Rhythm Radio Mix) – 4:53
"Shake Your Bon-Bon" (Almighty Mix) – 7:21
"Shake Your Bon-Bon" (Eddie's Club Radio Edit) – 3:53

European 12" single
"Shake Your Bon-Bon" (Almighty Mix) – 7:21
"Shake Your Bon-Bon" (Eddie's Bon-Bon Club Mix) – 6:33
"Shake Your Bon-Bon" (Eddie's Club Radio Edit) – 3:53
"Shake Your Bon-Bon" (Album Version) – 3:12

Japanese CD maxi-single
"Shake Your Bon-Bon" – 3:12
"Shake Your Bon-Bon" (Eddie's Club Radio Edit) – 3:53
"Shake Your Bon-Bon" (Eddie's Rhythm Radio Mix) – 4:53
"Ay, Ay, Ay It's Christmas" – 3:03
 
Mexican promotional CD single
"Shake Your Bon-Bon" (Club Radio Edit) – 3:53  
"Shake Your Bon-Bon" (Eddie's Bon-Bon Club Mix) – 6:33  
"Shake Your Bon-Bon" (Rhythm T.V. Track) – 4:40  
"Shake Your Bon-Bon" (Club T.V. Track) – 6:33  
"Shake Your Bon-Bon" (Rhythm Radio Mix) – 4:53  
"Shake Your Bon-Bon" (Eddie's Instrumental Mix) – 6:33  
"Shake Your Bon-Bon" (Album Version) – 3:12  

UK CD maxi-single #1
"Shake Your Bon-Bon" – 3:12
"Livin' la Vida Loca" (Trackmasters Remix) – 3:46
"María" (12" Club Mix) – 5:50

UK CD maxi-single #2
"Shake Your Bon-Bon" – 3:12
"She's All I Ever Had" – 4:55
"She's All I Ever Had" (Hex Hector Radio Mix) – 4:39

UK promotional 12" single
"Shake Your Bon-Bon" (Almighty Mix) – 7:21
"Shake Your Bon-Bon" (Almighty Dub) – 5:14

US CD single
"Shake Your Bon-Bon" (Album Version) – 3:12
"Almost a Love Song" ("Casi un Bolero") – 4:40

US CD maxi-single
"Shake Your Bon-Bon" (Album Version) – 3:12
"Shake Your Bon-Bon" (Eddie Arroyo Club Mix) – 6:33
"Shake Your Bon-Bon" (Fernando Garibay Club Mix) – 5:58
"She's All I Ever Had" (Hex Hector 12" Club Mix) – 8:31
"Almost a Love Song" ("Casi un Bolero") – 4:40

US 12" single
"Shake Your Bon-Bon" (Eddie Arroyo Club Mix) – 6:33
"Shake Your Bon-Bon" (Eddie Arroyo Instrumental Club Mix) – 6:33
"Shake Your Bon-Bon" (Album Version) – 3:12
"Shake Your Bon-Bon" (Fernando Garibay Club Mix) – 5:58
"She's All I Ever Had" (Hex Hector 12" Club Mix) – 8:31

Charts and certifications

Weekly charts

Year-end charts

Certifications and sales

References

1999 songs
1999 singles
Ricky Martin songs
Columbia Records singles
Songs written by Desmond Child
Songs written by George Noriega
Songs written by Draco Rosa
Music videos directed by Wayne Isham
Songs about dancing